is an electoral district in the Japanese House of Representatives. It was first created as part of the 2022 reapportionments that added 5 districts in Tokyo. This district will elect its first member during the 2025 general election.

Areas Covered

Current District 
As of 11 January 2023, the areas covered by the district are as follows:

 Meguro
 Ōta, Tokyo (Western section)
 Minemachi, Denenchofu, Unoki, Yukigaya and Senzoku branch offices
 Kugahara branch office (excluding Ikegami-3)
 Yaguchi branch office (excluding Yaguchi 2 (1, 13, 14, 27 and 28) and Yaguchi 3 (1 and 8)

Before the creation of this district, Meguro Ward was split between the 5th and 6th districts, and the western Ota Ward area was split between the 3rd and 4th districts

Elected Representatives

Election Results

References 

Ōta, Tokyo
Meguro
Constituencies established in 2022
Districts of Tokyo